Howard & David is the tenth studio album by American country music duo The Bellamy Brothers. It was released in 1985 via MCA and Curb Records. The includes the singles "Old Hippie", "Feelin' the Feelin'" and "Lie to You for Your Love".

Track listing

Personnel
Adapted from liner notes.

The Bellamy Brothers
David Bellamy - lead & harmony vocals
Howard Bellamy - lead & harmony vocals

Musicians
Richard Bennett - guitar, guitar solos on "Wheels" & "I'm Gonna Hurt Her on the Radio"
Matt Betton - drums
Sonny Garrish - steel guitar
Emory Gordy Jr. - bass guitar
John Barlow Jarvis - keyboards
Nicolette Larson - background vocals on "Everybody's Somebody's Darlin'"
Charlie McCoy - harmonica on "Old Hippie"
Billy Joe Walker Jr. - guitar, all guitar solos except "Wheels" & "I'm Gonna Hurt Her on the Radio"
Reggie Young - guitar

Chart performance

References

1985 albums
The Bellamy Brothers albums
Albums produced by Jimmy Bowen
Albums produced by Emory Gordy Jr.
MCA Records albums
Curb Records albums